The Fédération Internationale de Hockey (English: International Hockey Federation), commonly known by the acronym FIH, is the international governing body of field hockey and indoor field hockey. Its headquarters are in Lausanne, Switzerland. FIH is responsible for field hockey's major international tournaments, notably the Hockey World Cup.

History
FIH was founded on 7 January 1924 in Paris by Paul Léautey, who became the first president, in response to field hockey's omission from the programme of the 1924 Summer Olympics. First members complete to join the seven founding members were Austria, Belgium, Czechoslovakia, France, Hungary, Spain, and Switzerland.

In 1983, the FIH merged with the International Federation of Women's Hockey Associations (IFWHA), which had been founded in 1927 by Australia, Denmark, England, Ireland, Scotland, South Africa, the United States, and Wales.

The organisation has been based in Lausanne, Switzerland since 2005, having moved from Brussels, Belgium.

In response to the 2022 Russian invasion of Ukraine, the FIH banned Russia from the 2022 Women's FIH Hockey Junior World Cup, and banned Russian and Belarusian officials from FIH events.

Structure

In total, there are 140 member associations within the five confederations recognised by FIH. This includes Great Britain which is recognised as an adherent member of FIH, the team was represented at the Olympics and the Champions Trophy. England, Scotland and Wales are also represented by separate teams in FIH sanctioned tournaments.

 AfHF – African Hockey Federation
 AHF – Asian Hockey Federation
 EHF – European Hockey Federation
 OHF – Oceania Hockey Federation
 PAHF – Pan American Hockey Federation

The FIH World Rankings was updated once after the major tournament finished, based on FIH sanction tournaments.

Presidents
The following is a list of presidents of FIH:

Recognition and awards
The Player of the Year Awards have been given annually since 1998 for men and women, while the young category was added in 2001 to honour the best performances for junior players (under 21).

Another award, the "Honorary Award", was given to people who have made outstanding contributions to field hockey.

FIH tournaments

Outdoor
Major
Men's FIH Hockey World Cup
Women's FIH Hockey World Cup
Men's FIH Pro League
Women's FIH Pro League
Field hockey at the Summer Olympics in cooperation with International Olympic Committee
Men's FIH Hockey Nations Cup
Women's FIH Hockey Nations Cup
FIH Hockey5s World Cup

Junior
Men's FIH Hockey Junior World Cup
Women's FIH Hockey Junior World Cup
Field hockey at the Youth Olympic Games in cooperation with International Olympic Committee

Other
Masters Hockey World Cup
Grand Master Hockey World Cup
International Children's Games

Indoor
 Men's Indoor Hockey World Cup
 Women's Indoor Hockey World Cup

Title holders

Partners
The following are the partners of the International Hockey Federation:
Hero MotoCorp

See also
FIH World Rankings
Hockey Rules Board
History of field hockey

References

External links
 

 
Field hockey organizations
Organisations based in Lausanne
Sports organizations established in 1924
1924 establishments in France